The near-infrared (NIR) window (also known as optical window or therapeutic window) defines the range of wavelengths from 650 to 1350 nanometre (nm) where light has its maximum depth of penetration in tissue. Within the NIR window, scattering is the most dominant light-tissue interaction, and therefore the propagating light becomes diffused rapidly. Since scattering increases the distance travelled by photons within tissue, the probability of photon absorption also increases. Because scattering has weak dependence on wavelength, the NIR window is primarily limited by the light absorption of blood at short wavelengths and water at long wavelengths. The technique using this window is called NIRS. Medical imaging techniques such as fluorescence image-guided surgery often make use of the NIR window to detect deep structures.

Absorption properties of tissue components
The absorption coefficient is defined as the probability of photon absorption in tissue per unit path length. Different tissue components have different  values. Moreover,  is a function of wavelength. Discussed below are the absorption properties of the most important chromophores in tissue. The molar extinction coefficient is another parameter that is used to describe photon absorption in tissue.

Blood
Blood consists of two different types of hemoglobin: oxyhemoglobin is bound to oxygen, while deoxyhemoglobin is unbound to oxygen. These two different types of hemoglobin exhibit different absorption spectra that are normally represented in terms of molar extinction coefficients, as shown in Figure 1. The molar extinction coefficient of Hb has its highest absorption peak at 420 nm and a second peak at 580 nm. Its spectrum then gradually decreases as light wavelength increases. On the other hand,  shows its highest absorption peak at 410 nm, and two secondary peaks at 550 nm and 600 nm. As light wavelengths passes 600 nm,  absorption decays much faster than Hb absorption.

By using two different wavelengths, it is possible to calculate the concentrations of oxyhemoglobin and deoxyhemoglobin as shown in the following equations:

 

Oxygen saturation can then be computed as

Water 
Although water is nearly transparent in the range of visible light, it becomes absorbing over the near-infrared region. Water is a critical component since its concentration is high in human tissue. The absorption spectrum of water in the range from 250 to 1000 nm is shown in Figure 2. Although absorption is rather low in this spectral range, it still contributes to the overall attenuation of tissue.

 

Other tissue components with less significant contributions to the total absorption spectrum of tissue are melanin and fat.

Melanin
Melanin is a chromophore that exists in the human epidermal layer of skin responsible for protection from harmful UV radiation. When melanocytes are stimulated by solar radiation, melanin is produced. Melanin is one of the major absorbers of light in some biological tissue (although its contribution is smaller than other components). There are two types of melanin: eumelanin which is black-brown and pheomelanin which is red-yellow. The molar extinction coefficient spectra corresponding to both types are shown in Figure 3.

Fat
Fat is one of the major components in tissue that can comprise 10-40% of tissue. Although not many mammalian fat spectra are available, Figure 4 shows an example extracted from pig fat.

Scattering properties of tissue components
Optical scattering occurs due to mismatches in refractive index of the different tissue components, ranging from cell membranes to whole cells. Cell nuclei and mitochondria are the most important scatterers. Their dimensions range from 100 nm to 6 μm, and thus fall within the NIR window. Most of these organelles fall in the Mie scattering regime, and exhibit highly anisotropic forward-directed scattering.

Light scattering in biological tissue is denoted by the scattering coefficient, which is defined as the probability of photon scattering in tissue per unit path length. Figure 5 shows a plot of the scattering spectrum.

Effective attenuation coefficient
Attenuation of light in deep biological tissue depends on the effective attenuation coefficient, which is defined as

where  is the transport scattering coefficient defined as

where  is the anisotropy of biological tissue, which has a representative value of 0.9. The effective attenuation coefficient is the dominant factor for determining light attenuation at depth  ≫ 1/ .

Estimation of the NIR window in tissue
The NIR window can be computed based on the absorption coefficient spectrum or the effective attenuation coefficient spectrum. A possible criterion for selecting the NIR window is given by the FWHM of the inverse of these spectra as shown in Figure 7. 

In addition to the total concentration of hemoglobin, the oxygen saturation will define the concentration of oxy and deoxyhemoglobin in tissue and so the total absorption spectrum. Depending on the type of tissue, we can consider different situations. Below, the total concentration of hemoglobin is assumed to be 2.3 mM.

Absorption spectrum for arteries
In this case  ≈ 98% (arterial oxygen saturation). Then oxyhemoglobin will be dominant in the total absorption (black) and the effective attenuation (magenta) coefficient spectra, as shown in Figure 6 (a).
'cite: Anisotropic diffusion filter for dorsal hand vein features extraction - Sarah Hachemi Benziane, Abdelkader Benyettou'

Absorption spectrum for veins
In this case  ≈ 60% (venous oxygen saturation). Then oxyhemoglobin and deoxyhemoglobin will have similar contributions to the total absorption (black) and the effective attenuation (magenta) coefficient spectra, as shown in Figure 6 (b).

Absorption spectrum for breast tissue
Thus tissue oxygen saturation can be defined as  = 0.2 x  + 0.8 x  ≈ 70%. 

The total absorption (black) and the effective attenuation (magenta) coefficient spectra for breast tissue is shown in Figure 6 (c). In addition, the effective penetration depth is plotted in Figure 7.

See also
Optical window
Near-infrared spectroscopy

References 

Infrared imaging
Biophysics